Agustín Fernández may refer to:

 Agustín Fernández Sánchez (born 1958), Bolivian composer
 Agustín Fernández Mallo (born 1967), Spanish physicist and writer
 Agustín Fernández (footballer) (born 1982), Spanish footballer
 Agustín Fernández (runner) (born 1938), Spanish Olympic runner
 Agustín Fernández (artist) (1928–2006), Cuban artist